Seblak (Sundanese: ᮞᮨᮘᮣᮊ᮪) is a Sundanese savoury and spicy dish, originating from West Java, Indonesia. Made of wet krupuk (traditional Indonesian crackers) cooked with protein sources (egg, chicken, seafood or beef) in spicy sauce. Seblak is a specialty of Bandung city, West Java, Indonesia. Seblak is common at restaurants, warungs, and gerobak (cart) street vendors. It is one of the most popular street foods in Indonesia, especially in Bandung and Jakarta.

Etymology
The word seblak may have originated Sundanese that is Nyeblak or surprising, because it tastes spicy and rich in spices. Seblak also refers to ingredients of Sundanese cuisine, made from cikur or Galangal (Kaempferia galanga).

Ingredients
At first glance, the ingredients and cooking method of seblak is quite similar to other common Indonesian food, such as mie goreng and kwetiau goreng, however seblak differ with the chewy gelatin-like texture of wet krupuk, and mostly quite spicy, owed to generous addition of sambal chili paste. Customer might order the degree of spiciness of their seblak priorly, although the default taste was quite hot and spicy. Almost all kinds of krupuk can be made as seblak, but the most savoury (and usually more expensive) version uses krupuk udang (prawn crackers). The wet krupuk is boiled or stir fried with scrambled egg, vegetables, and other protein sources; either chicken, seafood (prawn, fish and squid), or slices of beef sausages or bakso, stir-fried with spicy sauces including garlic, shallot, kencur, kecap manis (sweet soy sauce), and sambal chili sauce.

Moisted krupuk would shrunk into smaller size compared to crispy fried ones, thus a lot of krupuks are required to make a bowl of seblak. Since krupuk — especially prawn and fish crackers, are quite costly, the cheaper street food version usually add other carbohydrate sources as a filler in order to lessen the use of wet krupuk, and to make it more satisfying. These extra carbs are slices of kwetiau and/or macaroni.  Another popular variant uses chicken feet as one of main ingredients.

Origin

In earlier days, the term seblak refer to hot and spicy spice mixture made from ground kencur (Kaempferia galanga) and chili pepper. It is also refer to a traditional hot and spicy crispy krupuk crackers originate from rural southern Cianjur area before the independence era, this food was an alternative food, which is now called as seblak kering (dry seblak) or krupuk seblak. However, today it is mostly refer to its wet and savoury version; the seblak basah.

Seblak is relatively a recent invention in Bandung, this new street food appeared in Bandung circa 2000s. It is suggested that the dish was originally started as a method to avoid wasting uneaten old krupuk; a way to safely (and pleasantly) consume stale old krupuk by cooking it with other ingredients, to make it more satisfying.

Nevertheless, the pleasantly soft and chewy texture, also its savoury, rich and spicy taste, has made seblak a street food favourite in Indonesia, especially the Sundanese people.

See also

 Krupuk
 Siomay
 Batagor
 Mie goreng

References

External links
How to make Seblak
Resep seblak kuah ceker sederhana
Seblak Recipe
Youtube video on Seblak with chicken claws

Sundanese cuisine
Fried foods
Street food in Indonesia